Josh Thomas (born 30 June 2000) is a Welsh rugby union player who plays for Newcastle Falcons as a fly-half or fullback. He signed a development contract with the Ospreys ahead of the 2018–19 season.

Thomas made his debut for the Ospreys in 2020 against the Dragons having previously played for the Ospreys academy.

He signed for Newcastle Falcons in May 2022 on a two year deal.

References

External links 
itsrugby Profile

Welsh rugby union players
Ospreys (rugby union) players
Living people
Rugby union fly-halves
Rugby union fullbacks
2000 births

Falcons (rugby union) players